Hao Weiya (Chinese 郝维亚, born Xi'an) is a Chinese composer. His opera A Village Teacher (2009) was announced as the first "realistic" opera produced by the NCPA and CNOH. He also created a new end for the opera Turandot of Giacomo Puccini in 2008, where he wrote a new aria for Princess Turandot.

References

People's Republic of China composers
Living people
Chinese male classical composers
Chinese classical composers
Chinese opera composers
Musicians from Xi'an
Year of birth missing (living people)
Place of birth missing (living people)
Male opera composers